"Bright Lights" is the fourth official single from Placebo's sixth studio album, Battle for the Sun, released on 8 February 2010 as a digital download or CD single (limited to France and Germany). The new single version was mixed by Dave Bascombe, while the album version was mixed by Alan Moulder. The new single version would later be included in the Battle for the Sun: Redux Edition.

After Placebo released their single, Bright Lights saw coverage on AOL, Drowned in Sound, Indie London and Metro Newspaper.

Track listing
CD single (France/Germany only)
 "Bright Lights" (single version)
 "The Never-Ending Why" (SFR live)
 "Bright Lights" (Randomer Remix-Dub)

Digital download bundle
 "Bright Lights" (single version)
 "Bright Lights" (album version)
 "The Never-Ending Why" (SFR live)
 "Bright Lights" (Randomer Remix-Dub)

iTunes deluxe bundle
 "Bright Lights" (single version)
 "Bright Lights" (album version)
 "The Never-Ending Why" (SFR live)
 "Bright Lights" (Randomer Remix-Dub)
 "Bright Lights" (video)

Charts
Source:

References

Placebo (band) songs
2010 singles
Songs written by Brian Molko
Songs written by Stefan Olsdal
2009 songs
PIAS Recordings singles
Song recordings produced by David Bottrill
Songs written by Steve Forrest (musician)
Songs written by William Patrick Lloyd